Prince Alexey Mikhaylovich Lvov (Russian Алексей Михайлович Львов, 158?-1653 or 1654) was a Russian Court Marshal for 20 years, and one of the most influential members of Michael of Russia's government.

Lvov began his career as a deputy governor of Nizhny Novgorod (1610), Rylsk (1615), and Astrakhan (1618–20). In 1621 he was sent to the court of Danish king Christian IV with a Tsar's proposition to marry one of Christian's nieces, the Schleswig-Holsteinian princesses, but the mission failed completely. After his return, he was made a deputy chief of Pomestny Prikaz.

In 1634, Lvov was one of two heads of Russian delegation in Russo-Polish negotiations which resulted in signing the Treaty of Polyanovka. After this success he was sent to Poland in 1635 as a head of an embassy to witness Władysław IV Vasa's oath of "eternal peace". In 1644 he once again went to Poland as Ambassador Plenipotentiary.

In 1644, Lvov and Boris Morozov became main opponents of Tsar Mikhail's plan to marry his daughter Irina to Dutch prince Valdemar Christian (they feared this marriage would generate an independent center of power). Finally, in 1645 they have managed to ruin it after a lot of intrigue.

In January 1626, Lvov was appointed to serve as a majordomo of the Tsar's court, in 1627 was made an okolnichy and official head of the Prikaz Bolshogo Dvortsa ('Prikaz of the Great Palace'), a government office dealing with the Tsar's palace economy and judging monasteries. Due to his efforts, this post was gradually turned into a place of great significance. After Ivan Cherkassky's death in 1642 it was actually Lvov who might be called a Tsar's "Chancellor", not weak and despised nominal head of government Fedor Sheremetev (Lvov's close friend). Since 1645 he shared power with Boris Morozov. In 1647 he, Lvov retired.

References

Sources 
 
 Андреев И. Алексей Михайлович. М., 2003

1580s births
1653 deaths
Russian princes
Tsardom of Russia people
Boyars
Alexey